Jesús Welmer Ramos González (born 13 January 1961) is an economist, administrator and Costa Rican politician. He served as Minister of Economy, Industry and Commerce and President of the Governing Board of the Development Banking System between 2014 and 2017 within the Solís Rivera administration and national deputy during the 2018–2022 period.

Ramos obtained a bachelor's degree in Economics from the Autonomous University of Central America and two master's degrees, one in Business Administration with an emphasis in Finance from the Inter-American University of Costa Rica in 1992 and another in Evaluation of Programs and Development Projects of the University of Costa Rica in 2004.

Ramos served as an economist for the Central Bank of Costa Rica between 1987 and 2006 in various positions, a parliamentary adviser between 2006 and 2014 for the legislative faction of the Citizens' Action Party and as a postgraduate professor at the Fidelitas, Fundepos and Costa Rica universities. He was appointed Minister of Economy by President Luis Guillermo Solis, a position he held between May 1, 2014 and February 2, 2017, when he resigned to aspire to the presidential nomination by his party held at the National Citizen Convention 2017, but he lost the primary. He participated again in the National Citizen Convention 2021, and won the presidential nomination by his party on August 30, 2021.

References

1961 births
Living people
Costa Rican economists
Government ministers of Costa Rica
Citizens' Action Party (Costa Rica) politicians